St Mungo's Church is a Roman Catholic Parish Church in the Townhead area of Glasgow, Scotland. It was built in 1841, with later work done on the church in 1877, and designed by George Goldie. It is situated on the corner of Parson Street and Glebe Street, east of St Mungo's Catholic Primary School and west of the Springburn Road. It was founded by the Passionists, is a Gothic Revival church and is a category B listed building.

History
The church was first built in 1841. The architect was George Goldie. He built the church in the Italian Gothic architectural style. Nine years later, the church became the centre of a parish. In 1865, the Passionists arrived in Scotland. They came from Ireland and began to minister to the parish. From St Mungo's Church, the Passionists went out and ministered to Catholics in other parts of Scotland, such as St Joseph's Church in Helensburgh in 1867. In 1877, the church was altered, again to the designs of George Goldie.

In 1899, the parish of St Stephen's Church in Sighthill became part of the same parish as St Mungo's and the Passionists minister to both churches.

Parish
Next to the church, to the east, is St Mungo's Retreat. In addition, to the north is the parish hall that acts as a day centre.

The church has four Sunday Masses they are at 6:00pm on Saturday and 10:00am, 12 noon and 7:00pm on Sunday. There are also weekday Masses at 10:00am and 12:15pm.

Exterior

See also
 Roman Catholic Archdiocese of Glasgow
 Passionists

References

External links

 
 Passionists UK site

Saint Mungo
Listed Roman Catholic churches in Scotland
Roman Catholic churches in Scotland
Roman Catholic churches completed in 1877
1850 establishments in Scotland
Religious organizations established in 1850
Gothic Revival church buildings in Scotland
Saint Mungo
19th-century Roman Catholic church buildings in the United Kingdom
Passionist Order
George Goldie church buildings
Listed churches in Glasgow